Ossie is a nickname usually used in place of a given name such as Osama, Osman, Oswald, Oscar, Ossian, Osmond, Osbourne and Osvaldo. In Assyrian Neo-Aramaic, it is used as a diminutive for Joseph and Yousif. 
It may refer to:

People

Given name 
 Ossie Abeygunasekera (1950–1994), assassinated Sri Lankan politician
 Osvaldo Ardiles (born 1952), Argentinian football manager, pundit and former player
 Ossie Asmundson (1908–1964), Canadian National Hockey League player
 Ossie Bertram (1909–1983), Australian rules footballer
 Ossie Blanco, 1970s baseball player
 Ossie Bluege (1900–1985), American Major League Baseball player
 Ossie Byrne (1926–1983), Australian record producer best known for his work with the early Bee Gees
 Ossie Clark (1942–1996), British fashion designer
 Ossie Davis (1917–2005), African-American actor and activist
 Ossie Dawson (1919–2008), South African cricketer
 Ossie Fraser (1923–1982), Canadian politician
 Ossie Green (1906–1991), Australian rules footballer
 Ossie Lovelock (1911–1981), Australian sportsman
 Ossie Male (1893–1975), Welsh rugby union player
 Ossie Moore (born 1958), Australian golfer
 Oswald Morris (1915–2014), British cinematographer 
 Ossie Nicholson (1906–1965), Australian cyclist
 Ossie Nortjé (born 1990), South African rugby union player
 Ossie Ocasio (born 1955), Puerto Rican retired boxer and former world cruiserweight champion
 Ossie Pickworth (1918–1969), Australian golfer
 Ossie Schectman (1919–2013), American basketball player who scored the first basket in  National Basketball Association history
 Ossie Solem (1891–1970), American college football and basketball head coach
 Ossie Vitt (1890–1963), American Major League baseball player and manager
 Peter Osgood (1947–2006), English footballer nicknamed 'Ossie'

Surname 
 Manuel Ossie (born 1968), Liberian boxer

Fictional characters
 Ossie Ostrich, on the Australian TV programs Tarax Show, Hey Hey It's Saturday and The Ossie Ostrich Video Show
 Oswald the Lucky Rabbit, created by Ub Iwerks and Walt Disney for funny animal films in the 1920s and '30s

See also
 Ozzie
 Ossi (disambiguation)

Masculine given names
Lists of people by nickname
Hypocorisms